Partial concurrent thinking aloud (or partial concurrent think-aloud, or PCTA) is a method used to gather data in usability testing with screen reader users. It is a particular kind of think aloud protocol (or TAP) created by Stefano Federici and Simone Borsci at the Interuniversity Center for Research on Cognitive Processing in Natural and Artificial Systems of University of Rome "La Sapienza". The partial concurrent thinking aloud is built up in order to create a specific usability assessment technique for blind users, eligible to maintain the advantages of concurrent and retrospective thinking aloud while overcoming their limits. Using PCTA blind users' verbalizations of problems could be more pertinent and comparable to those given by sighted people who use a concurrent protocol. In the usability evaluation with blind people, the retrospective thinking aloud is often adopted as a functional solution to overcome the structural interference due to thinking aloud and hearing the screen reader imposed by the classic thinking aloud technique; such a solution has yet a relapse in the evaluation method, because the concurrent and the retrospective protocols measure usability from different points of view, one mediated by navigation experience (retrospective) one more direct and pertinent (concurrent). The use of PCTA could be widened to both summative and formative usability evaluations with mixed panels of users, thus extending the number of problems' verbalizations according to disabled users' divergent navigation processes and problem solving strategies.

Cognitive assumptions

In general, in the usability evaluation both retrospective and concurrent TAP could be used according to the aims and goals of the study. Nevertheless, when a usability evaluation is carried out with blind people several studies propose to use the retrospective TAP: indeed, using a screen reader and talking about the way of interacting with the computer implies a structural interference between action and verbalization. Undoubtedly, cognitive studies provided a lot of evidence supporting the idea that individuals can listen, verbalize, or manipulate, and rescue information in multiple task condition. As Colin Cherry showed, subjects, when listening to two different messages from a single loudspeaker, can separate sounds from background noise, recognize the gender of the speaker, the direction, and the pitch (cocktail party effect). At the same time, subjects that must verbalize the content of a message (attended message) listening to two different message simultaneously (attended and unattended message) have a reduced ability to report the content of the attended massage, while they are unable to report the content of the unattended message. Moreover, K. Anders Ericsson and Walter Kintsch showed that, in a multiple task condition, subjects' ability of rescuing information is not compromised by an interruption of the action flow (as it happens in the concurrent thinking aloud technique), thanks to the “Long Term Working Memory mechanism” of information retrieval (Working Memory section Ericsson and Kintsch). 
Even if users can listen, recognize, and verbalize multiple messages in a multiple task condition and they can stop and restart actions without losing any information, other cognitive studies underlined that the overlap of activities in a multiple task condition have an effect on the goal achievement: Kemper, Herman and Lian, analysing the users' abilities to verbalize actions in a multiple task condition, showed that the fluency of a user's conversation is influenced by the overlap of actions. Adults are likely to continue to talk as they navigate in a complex physical environment. However, the fluency of their conversation is likely to change: Older adults are likely to speak more slowly than they would if resting; Young adults continue to speak just as rapidly while walking as while resting, but they adopt a further set of speech accommodations, reducing sentence length, grammatical complexity, and propositional density. Just by reducing length, complexity, and propositional density adults free up working memory resources.
We do not know how and how much the content of verbalizations could be influenced by the strategy of verbalization (i.e. the modification of fluency and the complexity in a multiple task condition). Anyway, we well know that users in the concurrent thinking aloud verbalize the problems in a more accurate and pertinent way (i.e. more focused on the problems directly perceived during the interaction) then in the retrospective one. The pertinence is granted to the user by the proximity of action-verbalization-next action; this multiple task proximity compels the subject to apply a strategy of verbalization that reduce the overload of the working memory. However, for blind users this time proximity between action and verbalization is lost: the use of the screen reader, in fact, increase the time for verbalization (i.e. in order to verbalize, blind users must first stop the [screen reader] and then restart it).

Protocol
PCTA method is composed of two sections, one concurrent and one retrospective:

The first section is a modified concurrent protocol built up according to the three concurrent verbal protocols criteria described by K. Anders Ericsson and Herbert A. Simon:

The second PCTA section is a retrospective one in which users analyse those problems previously verbalized in a concurrent way. The memory signs, created by users ringing the desk-bell, overcome the limits of classic retrospective analysis; indeed, these signs allow the users to be pertinent and consistent with their concurrent verbalization, thus avoiding the influence of long term memory and perceptual reworking.

See also 
 Comparison of usability evaluation methods
 Protocol analysis
 Think aloud protocol

References

Usability
Software testing
Human–computer interaction